Louis Graves (April 6, 1883 – January 23, 1965) was an American journalist and editor who founded the Chapel Hill Weekly. He played college football at the University of North Carolina at Chapel Hill as a running back. He wrote essays for the Baltimore Sun.

References

Further reading
 Graves, Louis. "The Dullest Game in the World". Harper's Weekly. April 8, 1916.

External links

1883 births
1965 deaths
American football quarterbacks
North Carolina Tar Heels football players
All-Southern college football players
American football fullbacks
People from Chapel Hill, North Carolina
20th-century American newspaper editors
Players of American football from North Carolina
Editors of North Carolina newspapers